"Happiness is a cigar called Hamlet" was an advertising campaign for Hamlet Cigars, which ran on television from 1966 until all tobacco advertising on television was banned in the UK in 1991. The campaign returned in cinemas in 1996, continuing there until 1999, with the final commemorative advert and the modified tagline, "Happiness will always be a cigar called Hamlet."

History 

The slogan and the entire campaign was created by the Collett Dickenson Pearce agency in 1966. The premise is that a man finds himself in an awkward or embarrassing situation and lights a Hamlet cigar. Lighting and smoking this cigar makes him smile and forget his woes. The adverts used an excerpt from a jazz rendition of Johann Sebastian Bach's Air on the G String, played by Jacques Loussier and his trio, which is still frequently associated with the brand.

The advertisements featured in television, radio and cinema commercials, various print media, and on billboards. One advert featured the 1982 Channel 4 blocks forming the number 5, then rewinding and then forming a jumbled mess, which then turned into a face with a cigar, making it smile. This advert was played from 1982 until 1989.

Celebrity appearances 
Numerous celebrities appeared in the adverts, including Ian Botham, Ronnie Corbett, and Gregor Fisher also Brian Glover in the guise of his "Baldy Man" character (from Naked Video), attempting to use a photo booth and later attempting to get a family portrait

The actor and comedian Russ Abbot spent years advertising Hamlet cigars.

Recognition 
The advert was listed as the eighth greatest television advertisement of all time by Channel 4 in 2000. Both the original Channel 4 ident and the Hamlet advert spoofing the ident were made by Martin Lambie-Nairn. Furthermore, the advert was ranked as the ninth greatest advertisement in an ITV list made in 2005 and as the third funniest television advertisement ever by Campaign Live in 2008.

References

External links 
 AdSlogans.com, includes links to a print ad and television commercial in QuickTime and Windows Media Player format
 Hamlet Cigar Cartoons 
 Hamlet advert by Martin Lambie-Nairn.

1966 in British television
Advertising campaigns
British advertising slogans
1966 neologisms
British television commercials
Tobacco advertising